A Southern Memoir is a 1975 vinyl album recorded by Bing Crosby at his own expense at TTG Studios, Los Angeles, California in January 1975.  He was accompanied by Paul Smith and his Orchestra.  Crosby leased the tracks to the English branch of Decca following negotiations with producer Geoff Milne and the album was issued on Decca's London label.

The album was issued on CD by Collectors' Choice Music (CCM 2160) in 2010 having been remixed from the original eight track master tapes by Robert S. Bader of Bing Crosby Enterprises. Seven bonus tracks were included in the CD.

Background
In January 1974, Crosby was seriously ill and after two weeks of tests, he underwent three and a half hours of major surgery. Two-fifths of his left lung and an abscess the size of a small orange were removed. The tumor was a rare fungus called nocardia. There were concerns that he would not be able to sing again and his recuperation took many months. He eventually did some television work and then decided to return to the recording studio.

Reception
The UK magazine The Gramophone reviewed the album saying: "Crosby can be sampled on his own to pleasant effect in “A Southern Memoir” which in conformity with its title is a relaxed, easy-going selection of numbers from below the Mason–Dixon line..."

Record producer, Ken Barnes, wrote: "This collection of “Southern-cum-mammy” type songs was a pet project of Bing’s and his affection for the material reveals itself time and again throughout each of the twelve songs. The small-band backings arranged by pianist-conductor Paul Smith are beautifully written and very well played. Bing sings with greater spirit and drive than on his album with Basie and some of the tracks, notably “Carolina in the Morning,” “Swanee,” and “Sailing Down the Chesapeake Bay” stand comparison with some of his best-ever up-tempo performances."

Personnel
Paul Smith (piano, conductor); Frank Capp (drums); Tony Rizzi (guitar, January 16 session); Allen Reuss (guitar, January 21 session); Joe Valenti (trumpet); Monty Budwig (bass); Dick Nash (trombone); Larry Bunker (percussion, January 16 session); Vic Feldman (percussion, January 21 session); Dominic Mumolo (saxophone); Don Raffell    (saxophone), Johnny Rotella (saxophone).

Track listing

References 

1975 albums
Bing Crosby albums
London Records albums
Concept albums